Walter McCoy (born November 15, 1958) is an American former sprinter who qualified for the 1980 U.S. Olympic team but was unable to compete due to the 1980 Summer Olympics boycott. He did however receive one of 461 Congressional Gold Medals created especially for the spurned athletes. He did compete in the 1984 Summer Olympics.

A native of Daytona Beach, Florida, McCoy attended Seabreeze High School. The Orlando Sentinel named McCoy among their list of the best high school track and field athletes in Central Florida history.

References

External links
IAAF profile for Walter McCoy

1958 births
Living people
Sportspeople from Daytona Beach, Florida
American male sprinters
Florida State Seminoles men's track and field athletes
Olympic track and field athletes of the United States
Athletes (track and field) at the 1984 Summer Olympics
Seabreeze High School alumni
Congressional Gold Medal recipients
Universiade medalists in athletics (track and field)
Goodwill Games medalists in athletics
Universiade gold medalists for the United States
Competitors at the 1986 Goodwill Games